The Grande-île Wildlife Refuge is a protected area of Quebec located in Saint-Ignace-de-Loyola in the D'Autray Regional County Municipality and one of the province's 11 wildlife refuges. This site on Great Island protects one of the largest Heron of North America.

Notes and references

See also

Related Articles 

 Archipelago of Saint-Pierre Lake
 Lake Saint-Pierre
 St. Lawrence River

Important Bird Areas of Quebec
Protected areas of Lanaudière
Protected areas established in 1992